L'Arena is an Italian local daily newspaper, based in Verona, Italy.

History and profile
Founded in 1866, shortly before the annexation of Veneto into the Kingdom of Italy, L'Arena is one of the oldest newspapers in Italy and the most popular newspaper in Verona. The owner and publisher of the daily is Società Athesis.

Carlo Terron, Italian drama critic and playwright, worked for the newspaper at the beginning of the 1940s.

References

External links
  

1866 establishments in Italy
Newspapers established in 1866
Italian-language newspapers
Mass media in Verona
Daily newspapers published in Italy